The Tibetan Language Institute is a private, non-profit educational organization located in Hamilton, Montana. Its mission is to present classes, seminars, workshops, and public lectures on Tibetan language, literature, and philosophy for the purpose of preserving Tibetan culture and enriching one's study of the Dharma. The main program of study is a series of classes in the Tibetan language (available via distance learning or through private tutoring in person).

Notes

External links 
Tibetan Language Institute

Language schools in the United States
Educational institutions established in 1996
1996 establishments in Montana
Non-profit organizations based in Montana
501(c)(3) organizations
Languages of Tibet
Tibetan culture
Tibetan literature